Paco is a nickname for the Spanish name Francisco.

Paco may also refer to:

Arts and entertainment
 Paco (film), a 2009 Argentine film
 Paco (band), an American indie rock band
 Palo Alto Chamber Orchestra, an American youth orchestra
 Paco (comics), a DC Comics character
 Paco, the protagonist of the Ernest Hemingway short story "The Capital of the World"
 Prince Paco, the protagonist of the arcade game Marvel Land
 Paco, a fictional martial artist played by Paulo Tocha in the film Bloodsport

People
 Paco (surname)
 Paco (footballer) (born 1970), Spanish retired footballer

Other uses
 Cocaine paste, short for pasta de cocaína
 Paco (volcano), a volcano in the Philippines
 Paco, Manila, a district of Manila, Philippines
 Paco Catholic School
 Paco Church
 Paco Park
 PACO (magazine), an Esperanto magazine
 PaCO, Business, Portfolio and Change Office. A commonly used name for a directorate within a company.